The Brabham BT14 was an open-wheel mid-engined formula racing car, designed, developed and built by British manufacturer and constructor Brabham, in 1965. A total of 10 models were produced. It was specifically constructed to compete in Formula Libre racing. It competed in motor racing between 1965 and 1968; winning a total of 10 races (plus 2 additional class wins), scoring 22 podium finishes, and clinching 4 pole positions. It also contested the 1967 European F2 Championship season, competing in 7 races, but with no success; scoring no wins, pole positions, podium finishes, or scoring any points. It was powered by a naturally-aspirated  Ford twin-cam four-cylinder engine, which droves the rear wheels through a conventional 4-speed manual transmission.

References

Brabham racing cars
Formula Two cars
Open wheel racing cars
1960s cars